Haldia Government Sponsored X-Class Secondary School (H.S.), is one of the oldest school, in the village Basudevpur of sub-division Haldia, Purba Medinipur, West Bengal, India.  It is a co-ed Higher Secondary School.

The school follows the course curriculum of West Bengal Board of Secondary Education (WBBSE) and West Bengal Council of Higher Secondary Education (WBCHSE) for Standard 10th and 12th Board examinations with vocational education respectively .

External links
 Facebook community page

  
High schools and secondary schools in West Bengal
Schools in Purba Medinipur district
Educational institutions established in 1981
1981 establishments in West Bengal